The qualification matches for Group 4 of the European zone (UEFA) of the 1994 FIFA World Cup qualification tournament took place between April 1992 and November 1993. The group teams competed on a home-and-away basis for 2 of the 12 spots in the final tournament allocated to the European zone, with the group's winner and runner-up claiming those spots. The group consisted of Belgium, Cyprus, Czechoslovakia, Faroe Islands, Romania, and Wales. On 1 January 1993, Czechoslovakia split into the Czech Republic and Slovakia; the two nations completed the qualifiers as a single team under the name Representation of Czechs and Slovaks.

Standings

Results

Goalscorers

9 goals

 Florin Răducioiu

8 goals

 Ian Rush

6 goals

 Peter Dubovský

5 goals

 Marc Wilmots
 Gheorghe Hagi

4 goals

 Enzo Scifo
 Andreas Sotiriou
 Ilie Dumitrescu
 Gavril Balint
 Dean Saunders

3 goals

 Pavel Kuka
 Ioan Lupescu

2 goals

 Philippe Albert
 Radoslav Látal
 Václav Němeček
 Marek Poštulka
 Ryan Giggs
 Mark Hughes

1 goal

 Alexandre Czerniatynski
 Marc Degryse
 Rudi Smidts
 Lorenzo Staelens
 Yiannos Ioannou
 Nikos Papavasiliou
 Pambos Pittas
 Panayiotis Xiourouppas
 Pavel Hapal
 Ivan Hašek
 Miroslav Kadlec
 Ľubomír Moravčík
 Tomáš Skuhravý
 Petr Vrabec
 Uni Arge
 Ovidiu Hanganu
 Marius Lǎcǎtuş
 Constantin Pană
 Gheorghe Popescu
 Clayton Blackmore
 Mark Bowen
 Eric Young

1 own goal

 Jozef Chovanec (playing against Belgium)

Notes

External links
Group 4 Detailed Results at RSSSF

4
Romania at the 1994 FIFA World Cup
1992–93 in Romanian football
1992–93 in Belgian football
1993–94 in Belgian football
1992–93 in Welsh football
1993–94 in Welsh football
1992–93 in Cypriot football
1993–94 in Cypriot football
1992–93 in Czechoslovak football
1993–94 in Czech football
1993–94 in Slovak football
1992 in Faroe Islands football
1993 in Faroe Islands football
1991–92 in Belgian football
1991–92 in Cypriot football
1991–92 in Welsh football
1991–92 in Romanian football